Aliberti is a surname. Notable people with the surname include:

Gian Carlo Aliberti (also Giancarlo and Giovanni Carlo; 1662–1740), Italian painter
Giuseppe Aliberti (1901–1956), Italian football manager and former player  
Junior Aliberti (born 1977), Uruguayan footballer
Lucia Aliberti (born 1957), Sicilian opera singer
Sophia Aliberti (born 1963), Greek talk show host
Sotiria Aliberti or Soteria Aliberty (1847–1929), Greek feminist and educator

Italian-language surnames